Baker's Bay is a three-mile long bay on the island of Great Guana Cay. A clear and aqua sea grass bed in the Sea of Abaco, it was a favorite destination of Abaco Islands boaters for years.

Flora and fauna 
Baker's Bay is home to foraging and nesting sea turtles of up to five species including the Jamaican slider (Trachemys terrapen), the Green sea turtle (Chelonia mydas), the Loggerhead sea turtle (Caretta caretta). It is also home to a wide variety of sharks and large fish. Baker's Bay is created by two mangrove rivers from the island, which are important estuaries for the island's coral reef.

Environmental issues 
Dredging for a  private Premier Cruise Line Resort caused considerable environmental damage to the corals in the area, as corals are unable to withstand continuous silting.

Golf club controversy

Baker's Bay and Gumelemi Cay are the location of the Baker's Bay Golf & Ocean Club, as well as the controversy surrounding it. In 2004, the Discovery Land Company began the megadevelopment project, which is largely believed by conservation groups to have destroyed the area. Three independent scientists believe the coral reef will be destroyed by the construction of a golf course, marina and development structures.

References

Bodies of water of the Bahamas
Abaco Islands
Bays of the Bahamas